James Creighton Odiorne (June 4, 1802 – February 5, 1879) was an American businessman and author.

Odiorne was born in London, England, June 4, 1802. His father, George Odiorne, was a merchant of Boston, Mass, and while spending two years in England for purposes connected with his business, he married as his third wife Maria, daughter of Rev. James Creighton, an intimate associate of John Wesley.  The family came to America in the summer of 1802, and James was fitted for college at Phillips Academy, Andover.  He graduated from Yale College in 1826.

He was married, June 25, 1828, to Susan Elizabeth, eldest daughter of Isaac Warren, Esq., of Framingham, Mass., and in the same year became a partner with his father in the iron and nail trade in Boston, but retired from business in 1837. In 1857 he removed to Framingham, continuing however to spend the winters in part in Boston, where his wife died, Jan. 9, 1851. He was again married, June 8, 1870, to Frances M, youngest daughter of George Meacham, Esq, of Cambridge, Massachusetts. He died suddenly, in Wellesley, Mass., February 5, 1879, while on the cars in a journey from Framingham to Boston.

After his retirement from business he indulged his tastes for historical and scientific studies, and also gave considerable attention to the law. In 1830 he took a deep interest in the movement against the Free Masons, and published a volume of 300 pages, entitled Opinions on Speculative Masonry. In 1832 he assisted in the formation of the New England Anti-Slavery Society, and for many years he served as its treasurer. He was also an active member of the American Statistical Association, and of the Boston Society of Natural History. In 1875, he published a Genealogy of the Odiorne Family (222 pages, octavo).

Of the four sons and two daughters by his first marriage, three sons and one daughter survived him.

External links
 Books by Odiorne

1802 births
1879 deaths
American male writers
Phillips Academy alumni
Yale College alumni
British emigrants to the United States
Anti-Masonry
American abolitionists